Willie Murphy may refer to:
Willie Murphy (Cork hurler) (1915–1977), Irish hurler for Ballincollig and Cork, 1939–1949
Willie Murphy (Kilkenny hurler) ( 1960s/1970s), Irish hurler for Rower-Inistioge and Kilkenny
Willie Murphy (Wexford hurler) (born 1944), Irish hurler for Faythe Harriers and Wexford, 1965–1979
Willie Murphy (baseball) (1864–?), baseball player
Willie Murphy (musician) (1943–2019), American musician
 Willy Murphy (1937–1976), American underground cartoonist

See also
William Murphy (disambiguation)